The Laticauda is a breed of domestic sheep from Campania and Calabria, in southern Italy. It is a fat-tailed breed, which gives rise to the name Laticauda, "broad-tailed". It is raised mainly in its area of origin in the provinces of Avellino, Benevento and Caserta, but is also found in the provinces of Cosenza, Matera and Naples. Like the Barbaresca breed of Sicily, it appears to result from the hybridisation of local breeds with Barbary (or Barbarin) sheep of Maghrebi origin. It has been suggested that these were first brought to the area by the Bourbon king Charles VII of Naples.

The Laticauda is one of the seventeen autochthonous Italian sheep breeds for which a genealogical herdbook is kept by the Associazione Nazionale della Pastorizia, the Italian national association of sheep-breeders. Total numbers for the breed were estimated at 60,000 in 1983; in 2013 the number recorded in the herdbook was 2802. The region of Campania estimates the total number at 7000 head.

Lambs are usually slaughtered at the age of about a month, at a weight of 10–15 kg. Milk yield is about 120–140 litres per lactation. The milk has 7–13% fat and 5.5–8.5% protein; it is the only milk used in the production of Pecorino di Laticauda Sannita, a pecorino cheese for which DOP status has been requested. It is also used to create Pecorino di Carmasciano.

The Barbaresca della Campania
A sheep breed named "Barbaresca della Campania (laticauda)" is reported to DAD-IS independently from the Laticauda. It is apparently the same breed. Neither the Associazione Nazionale della Pastorizia nor the Ministero delle politiche agricole alimentari e forestali, the Italian ministry of agriculture, make any mention of such a breed.

References

Sheep breeds originating in Italy
Ark of Taste foods